Karleen Bradford (born December 16, 1936) is a Canadian children's author.

Bradford's novel Dear Canada: With Nothing But Our Courage is a historical novel about a Loyalist family in the United States after the American Revolution.

Personal
Born in Toronto, Ontario, Bradford moved to Argentina as a child. She returned to Canada to attend university, and after graduation, she spent 34 years in different parts of the world as a wife of a Foreign Service Officer. She currently resides in Owen Sound, Ontario.

Published Books
A Year for Growing (1977) - republished as Wrong Again Robby in 1983
The Other Elizabeth (1982)
I Wish There Were Unicorns (1983)
The Stone in the Meadow (1983)
The Haunting at Cliff House (1985)
The Nine Days Queen (1986)
Windward Island (1989) - winner of the 1990 Max and Greta Ebel Award
There Will be Wolves (1992) - winner of the 1993 Canadian Library Association Young Adult Book Award
Thirteenth Child (1994)
Animal Heroes (1995)
Write Now! (1996)
Shadows on a Sword (1996)
More Animal Heroes (1996)
Dragonfire (1997)
A different Kind of Companion (1998)
Lionheart's Scribe (1999)
Whisperings of Magic (2001)
Dear Canada: With Nothing But Our Courage: The Loyalist Diary of Mary MacDonald, Johnstown, Quebec, 1783 (2002)
Angeline (2004)
You Can't Rush a Cat (2004)
The Scarlet Cross (2006)
Dragonmaster (2009)

References

External links
 
 
 

1936 births
Canadian children's writers
Canadian fantasy writers
Writers from Toronto
Living people
Canadian historical novelists
Writers of historical fiction set in the early modern period
Canadian women novelists